Dags att tänka på refrängen is a studio album by Gyllene Tider, released 24 April 2013. The album topped the Swedish Albums Chart and was certified 2× platinum in the country.

Track listing
 "Det blir aldrig som man tänkt sej" – 2:53
 "Man blir yr" – 3:02
 "Single" – 3:02
 "Allt jag lärt mej om livet (har jag lärt mej av Vera)" – 3:00
 "Tio droppar regn" – 2:54
 "Jag tänker åka på en lång lång lång lång lång resa" – 2:54
 "Lyckopiller" – 3:07
 "Chikaboom" – 3:08
 "Anders och Mickes första band" – 3:24
 "Tiden är en dåre med banjo" – 3:03
 "Knallpulver" – 2:32
 "Dags att tänka på refrängen" – 3:42

Contributors
 Per Gessle – vocals, guitar
 Mats "MP" Persson – guitar, piano, banjo, choir
 Anders Herrlin – bass, choir
 Micke "Syd" Andersson – drums, choir
 Göran Fritzon – organ, piano, choir

Charts

Weekly charts

Year-end charts

References 

2013 albums
Gyllene Tider albums